Lee Bo-mee (born 21 August 1988), also known as Bo-mee Lee, is a South Korean professional golfer currently playing on the LPGA of Japan Tour.

Lee played on the LPGA of Korea Tour, winning four events from 2009 to 2010. She has won 19 events on the LPGA of Japan Tour since 2012. She led the LPGA of Japan Tour money list in 2015 and 2016. She finished in solo second place at the 2012 Mizuno Classic, a co-sanctioned tournament on the LPGA Tour and LPGA of Japan Tours.

Professional wins (25)

LPGA of Japan Tour wins (21)

LPGA of Korea Tour wins (4)

Results in LPGA majors
Results not in chronological order before 2015.

^ The Evian Championship was added as a major in 2013.
DNP = did not play
CUT = missed the half-way cut
WD = withdrew
T = tied
Yellow background for a top-10 finish.

Team appearances
Professional
The Queens (representing Korea): 2015 (playing captain)

References

External links

Seoul Sisters profile

South Korean female golfers
LPGA of Japan Tour golfers
LPGA of Korea Tour golfers
1988 births
Living people